Nowe Zalesie may refer to the following places:
Nowe Zalesie, Masovian Voivodeship (east-central Poland)
Nowe Zalesie, Wysokie Mazowieckie County in Podlaskie Voivodeship (north-east Poland)
Nowe Zalesie, Zambrów County in Podlaskie Voivodeship (north-east Poland)